The  were a class of collier of the Imperial Japanese Navy (IJN), serving from roughly the end of World War I into World War II. Two vessels were built in 1918-19 under the Eight-four fleet plan.

Background
 In 1917, World War I was stagnant. The lengthy war led to an increase in shipping and a shortage of merchant ships.
 The IJN utilized steamship companies to perform coal transportation duties. However, this expedient was very costly. The IJN decided to build new colliers under the Eight-four fleet plan.  
 Their design was ordinary, because the IJN did not impose any special requirements on them.

Service
 In the 1920s, they engaged in coal transportation duties. 
 In February 1932, the Muroto was remodeled, becoming an auxiliary hospital ship.  She was refitted as a supply ship in 1941.
 In World War II, the value of coal as fuel fell. The ships engaged in transporting goods and troops.

Ships in class

Footnotes

Bibliography
Monthly Ships of the World, Special issue Vol. 47, "Auxiliary Vessels of the Imperial Japanese Navy", (Japan), March 1997
The Maru Special, Japanese Naval Vessels No. 34, "Japanese Auxiliary vessels",  (Japan), December 1979
Series 100 year histories from Meiji Era, Vol. 180, Histories of Naval organizations #8, Author: Ministry of the Navy, original plot in January 1940, reprinted in October 1971
IJN Nojima: Tabular Record of Movement, <http://www.combinedfleet.com/NojimaS_t.htm>
IJN Muroto: Tabular Record of Movement, <http://www.combinedfleet.com/Muroto_t.htm>

World War II naval ships of Japan
Colliers
Auxiliary transport ship classes